Seon Power (born 2 February 1984) is a Trinidadian international footballer as a defender for Cambodian club Prey Veng in the Cambodian League.

Club career
Born in Arima, Power has played club football for Joe Public, Ma Pau, North East Stars and Chainat Hornbill.

In July 2015 he moved on loan to Dome.

He then played for Phuket before returning to Trinidad with Central FC.

In April 2018 it was announced that Power had signed for Ulaanbaatar City FC of the Mongolia Premier League for the 2018 season.

He returned to Thailand with Krabi FC for the 2019 season, and also spent time with Nara United and Banbueng.

He signed for Cambodian club Prey Veng FC for the 2021 season.

International career
He made his international debut for Trinidad and Tobago in 2007, and has appeared in FIFA World Cup qualifying matches.

International goals
Scores and results list Trinidad and Tobago's goal tally first.

References

1984 births
Living people
Trinidad and Tobago footballers
Trinidad and Tobago international footballers
Joe Public F.C. players
Ma Pau Stars S.C. players
North East Stars F.C. players
Seon Power
Seon Power
Seon Power
Central F.C. players
Ulaanbaatar City FC players
Seon Power
Seon Power
Seon Power
Prey Veng FC players
TT Pro League players
Seon Power
Seon Power
Association football defenders
Trinidad and Tobago expatriate footballers
Trinidad and Tobago expatriate sportspeople in Thailand
Expatriate footballers in Thailand
Trinidad and Tobago expatriates in Mongolia
Expatriate footballers in Mongolia
Trinidad and Tobago expatriates in Cambodia
Expatriate footballers in Cambodia
2013 CONCACAF Gold Cup players
2007 CONCACAF Gold Cup players
Visakha FC players
Cambodian Premier League players